Paul Chato  is a Canadian comedian and writer, the president of a web design company, and a former television executive. He was born in 1954 in Toronto, Ontario, Canada, to Hungarian parents. Chato grew up in the first planned community in North America, Don Mills. Graduating from Don Mills Collegiate in 1973, he went on to graduate from Ryerson Polytechnical Institute in Radio Television Arts.

From Ryerson, he went on to become an art director with Kelly’s Stereo Mart and from there joined Rick Green to form Green and Chato, a two-man comedy team. In 1979, Green and Chato joined up with Dan Redican and Peter Wildman to form the comedy group The Frantics.

From 1989 to 1991, Chato was head of television comedy at CBC Television.

Apart from his continued association with The Frantics, Chato is the president of Your Web Department (formerly Electramedia), an international web development company.

Chato posts an IT-related comedy tech vlog on YouTube and Odysee under the name Call Me Chato.

External links
 
 Biography entry from The Official Frantics Web Site
 Paul Chato on Odysee
Paul Chato on YouTube
 Paul Chato website

Notes

1954 births
Living people
Canadian television personalities
Businesspeople from Toronto
Toronto Metropolitan University alumni
Canadian people of Hungarian-Jewish descent
Canadian sketch comedians
Comedians from Toronto
Canadian male comedians
Canadian Comedy Award winners
Canadian Broadcasting Corporation people
Canadian radio writers
Writers from Toronto